Pavonazzo marble also known as Pavonazzetto, Docimaean marble or Synnadic marble, is a whitish marble originally from Docimium, or modern İscehisar, Turkey. 

The name derives from the Italian word for peacock.

The marble has been used in Rome since the Augustan age, when large-scale quarrying began at Docimium, and columns of it were used in the House of Augustus, as well as in the Temple of Mars Ultor, which also had pavonazzo floor tiles in the cella. Pavonazzetto statues of kneeling Phrygian barbarians existed in the Basilica Aemilia and Horti Sallustiani. Giant statue groups carved from Docimaean marble were discovered at Tiberius's Villa in Sperlonga. Pavonazzetto was not widely or extensively used before the Roman period; there is no evidence of it in circulation before the last two decades BC.

Later it was used in Rome in Trajan's Markets and for the Memoria Petri, the tomb of Saint Peter and internationally in the influential Baroque Revival style historic buildings the Church of St. Ignatius Loyola, in New York City, and Belfast City Hall in Belfast, Northern Ireland.

See also
List of types of marble

References

Dacian
Building materials
Marble